Hypsotropa graptophlebia is a species of snout moth in the genus Hypsotropa. It was described by George Hampson in 1918 and is known from Mashonaland in Zimbabwe and South Africa.

References

Anerastiini
Lepidoptera of South Africa
Lepidoptera of Zimbabwe
Moths of Sub-Saharan Africa
Moths described in 1918